Mayerthorpe High School (MHS) is a high school located in Mayerthorpe, Alberta, Canada. The school's mascot is the tiger. The high school serves students in grades 7–12, and is part of the Northern Gateway Regional Division No. 10 school district.

Students 
There are currently 260 students enrolled. 

References

External links
Mayerthorpe High School official website

High schools in Alberta
Educational institutions in Canada with year of establishment missing